Fibiger is a lunar impact crater located on the lunar near side near the northern pole. The nearest major feature is the Byrd crater. The crater was adopted and named after Danish pathologist Johannes Andreas Grib Fibiger in 2009 by the IAU. Located just north of Fibiger are craters Erlanger and Peary, which are 9.9 km and 73 km in diameter, respectively.

References

External links
 LAC-1 area - Map of northern lunar pole

LQ01 quadrangle
Impact craters on the Moon